

90001–90100 

|-id=022
| 90022 Apache Point ||  || The Apache Point Observatory, owned and operated by the Astrophysical Research Consortium, is the site of the 2.5-meter Sloan Digital Sky Survey telescope and the 3.5-meter ARC telescope. || 
|}

90101–90200 

|-id=125
| 90125 Chrissquire ||  || Chris Squire (1948–2015), an English musician and co-founder of the rock music group Yes; 90125, the 1983 studio album by Yes. || 
|-id=138
| 90138 Diehl || 2002 YD || Jacqueline Diehl (born 1963), American first chair of the White Sands Star Party, member of the Alamogordo Astronomy Club, manager of Space Camp at the New Mexico Museum of Space History, and education and public outreach coordinator at the National Solar Observatory || 
|-id=140
| 90140 Gómezdonet ||  || Josep Juliá Gómez Donet, a Spanish astronomer and a discoverer of minor planets. He is one of the pioneers in CCD astrometric observation of minor planets and comets in the Valencia region, known for his work at the Marxuquera Observatory. He is a friend of the discoverer, Rafael Ferrando (Src). || 
|}

90201–90300 

|-id=226
| 90226 Byronsmith ||  || Byron Smith (born 1973), a mechanical engineer by training, is project manager for Lowell Observatory's Discovery Channel Telescope. || 
|-id=278
| 90278 Caprese ||  || Caprese Michelangelo is a village in the province of Arezzo, Tuscany, Italy. It is the birthplace of the Renaissance artist Michelangelo Buonarroti (1475–1564) and of the astronomer Giovanni Santini (1787–1877), who was director the Astronomical Observatory of Padua from 1817 to 1877. || 
|-id=279
| 90279 Devětsil ||  || Devětsil, Czech avant-garde group of artists active from 1920 to 1930 || 
|-id=288
| 90288 Dalleave ||  || Sergio Dalle Ave (born 1955), an Italian technician and night assistant at the Asiago Astrophysical Observatory since 1982, is an expert in graphics and in the enhancement of photographic plates. He contributed to the Asiago-DLR Asteroid Survey (ADAS) project by acquiring and storing data with the Schmidt telescope in Asiago. || 
|}

90301–90400 

|-id=308
| 90308 Johney ||  || John Ey (born 1952) is a photographer in Tucson who specializes in natural scenic images of the American west. He is also an amateur paleontologist primarily interested in carnivore dentition || 
|-id=317
| 90317 Williamcutlip ||  || William Cutlip (born 1960), the Launch Segment Manager for the OSIRIS-REx Asteroid Sample Return Mission. || 
|-id=328
| 90328 Haryou ||  || HARYOU (Harlem Youth Opportunities Unlimited) || 
|-id=370
| 90370 Jókaimór ||  || Mór Jókai (1825–1904), a Hungarian dramatist and novelist, was an imaginative, humorous and romantic writer. His work allows one to form a good idea of the character of this great Hungarian romancer and patriot. He was also a stargazer and owned an 8-cm refractor. || 
|-id=376
| 90376 Kossuth || 2003 VL || Lajos Kossuth (1802–1894) was a Hungarian lawyer, journalist, politician and governor-president of Hungary during the Hungarian Revolution of 1848-–1849. He was widely honored during his lifetime, including in the U.K. and U.S., as a freedom fighter and advocate for democracy in Europe || 
|-id=377
| 90377 Sedna ||  || Sedna, Inuit goddess of the sea || 
|-id=383
| 90383 Johnloiacono ||  || John Loiacono (born 1962), the Deputy Project Manager for the OSIRIS-REx Asteroid Sample Return Mission. || 
|-id=388
| 90388 Philchristensen ||  || Phil Christensen (born 1953), the Instrument Scientist for the OSIRIS-REx Thermal Emission Spectrometer. He is an expert on the geology of planetary surfaces. He was also the Principal Investigator for the infrared spectrometers and imagers on the Mars Global Surveyor, Mars Odyssey and Mars Exploration Rovers. || 
|-id=396
| 90396 Franklopez ||  || Frank Lopez (born 1955) is the owner of StellarVision Astronomy Shop in Tucson, Arizona. As such he has built many of the local amateur observatories, spoken to thousands of children at local schools and helped many budding astronomers || 
|-id=397
| 90397 Rasch ||  || Charlie Rasch (1937–2011), a well-known Jazz/Ragtime pianist in the Detroit area of Michigan. He was featured in about a dozen albums in the last 50 years. || 
|}

90401–90500 

|-id=414
| 90414 Karpov ||  || Anatoly Karpov (born 1951), Russian chess grandmaster and World Champion for 16 years || 
|-id=429
| 90429 Wetmore ||  || Shirley R. Wetmore (born 1947) was the senior curator at the University of Arizona Mineral Museum. In 2001 she received the university's Staff Excellence award. She has been a dedicated member and officer of the Tucson Gem and Mineral Society, which hosts the annual international Tucson Gem and Mineral Show || 
|-id=446
| 90446 Truesdell ||  || Robert Truesdell (born 1967) is a Tucson businessman and gifted amateur paleontologist specializing in the fossils of the American southwest || 
|-id=447
| 90447 Emans ||  || Mike Emans (born 1944) is a Seattle-area retired computer operations manager formerly with the Department of Information Services for the state of Washington. He is also a semi-professional guitarist with a group called "Common Threads" that played in the Washington area || 
|-id=449
| 90449 Brucestephenson ||  || C. Bruce Stephenson (born 1929) was appointed the Warner professor of astronomy at Case Western Reserve University and the Warner and Swasey Observatory in 1988. In 1977 he was co-discoverer of the unusual star SS 433 || 
|-id=450
| 90450 Cyriltyson ||  || Cyril deGrasse Tyson (1927–2016), American director of HARYOU (see 90328 Haryou) || 
|-id=453
| 90453 Shawnphillips || 2004 CM || Shawn Phillips (born 1943) is a singer/songwriter. Rooted in folk music, he also performs jazz fusion and funk. Phillips has released 26 albums and worked with many other artists, including Donovan, Steve Winwood and Eric Clapton. || 
|-id=455
| 90455 Irenehernandez ||  || Irene González Hernández (1969–2014) was a Spanish-American astronomer who worked as part of the GONG program to make major contributions to our understanding of the inhomogeneous internal structure of the Sun, as well as that of the otherwise invisible far-side of the Sun. || 
|-id=461
| 90461 Matthewgraham ||  || Matthew Graham (born 1971), a computational scientist working on analysis of massive data sets and sky surveys, including the Palomar-Quest and Catalina Real- Time Transient survey. || 
|-id=463
| 90463 Johnrichard ||  || John B. Dixon (born 1923) and Richard R. Dixon (born 1927), American amateur astronomers, in recognition of their help in transporting observatory domes from Michigan to New Mexico and then in the construction of the Jornada Observatory || 
|-id=471
| 90471 Andrewdrake ||  || Andrew Drake (born 1969), a scientist at the Center for Advanced Computing Research. || 
|-id=472
| 90472 Mahabal ||  || Ashish Mahabal (born 1970), a scientist at the California Institute of Technology. || 
|-id=479
| 90479 Donalek ||  || Ciro Donalek (born 1973) is a computational scientist who has applied machine learning to the analysis of massive data sets and sky surveys, including the Palomar- Quest and Catalina Real-Time Transient surveys. || 
|-id=480
| 90480 Ulrich ||  || Carl Ulrich (born 1925) is an American fossil preparator, known for his work on the fossils of the Green River Formation of Wyoming. He has instructed hundreds of people in his preparation techniques. His fossils can be seen in museums worldwide and at his gallery just outside the southern boundary of Fossil Butte National Monument. || 
|-id=481
| 90481 Wollstonecraft || 2004 DA || Mary Wollstonecraft (1759–1797), a British writer, philosopher, and early feminist || 
|-id=482
| 90482 Orcus || 2004 DW || Orcus, Roman god of the underworld, punisher of broken oaths || 
|-id=487
| 90487 Witherspoon ||  || Tom Witherspoon Sr. (1921–2014) was a well known fossil educator in the Midwest U.S. Thousands of people, not just children, were introduced to the world of paleontology through his efforts and generosity. In 2007 he received the Charles H. Sternberg award for outstanding lifetime achievement in the field of paleontology || 
|}

90501–90600 

|-id=502
| 90502 Buratti ||  || Bonnie J. Buratti (born 1952), American senior research scientist at the Jet Propulsion Laboratory, studies photometric properties of the surfaces of outer planet natural satellites and the small bodies of the solar system. She is a member of the science teams for the Clementine, Deep Space 1, Cassini–Huygens and New Horizons missions. || 
|-id=503
| 90503 Japhethboyce ||  || Japheth Boyce (born 1956), an American paleontologist in South Dakota, is best known for his exquisite fossil preparation seen in museums around the world. || 
|-id=525
| 90525 Karijanberg ||  || Karen (born 1953), wife of the discoverer James Whitney Young, and her parents, Richard (1928–1978) and Janet Halberg (1932–1997). || 
|-id=526
| 90526 Paullorenz ||  || Paul Gregory Lorenz (born 1952), a professional pianist and has been an avid amateur astronomer, deep sky observer and astrophotographer since the 1960s. || 
|-id=528
| 90528 Raywhite ||  || Raymond E. White Jr. (1933–2004), an American astronomer, archaeoastronomer who worked on globular clusters, best known and admired for his commitment to teaching and for his work as an advisor to undergraduates. Between 1964 and 1999 he was progressively an instructor, lecturer and professor at the University of Arizona. || 
|-id=533
| 90533 Laurentblind ||  || Laurent Blind (born 1965) a French computer programmer and boyfriend for 18 years of the discoverer Claudine Rinner. His knowledge of programming was a great help in building and automatizing the observatory. He is also a paraglider and equestrian. || 
|-id=564
| 90564 Markjarnyk ||  || Mark Andrew Jarnyk (1963–2006) was an Australian software engineer at the Australian National University's Research School of Astronomy and Astrophysics. He made significant contributions to instrumentation for the Gemini Observatory and the JACARA project. This asteroid is the first numbered discovery from the Siding Spring Survey. || 
|-id=579
| 90579 Gordonnelson ||  || Gordon Nelson (born 1956), an American amateur paleontologist in southern Arizona. He is a co-discoverer of the Sonorasaurus in the desert east of Tucson, Arizona. || 
|}

90601–90700 

|-id=672
| 90672 Metrorheinneckar || 1977 RH || The Rhine-Neckar Metropolitan Region with 2.4 million people along the Rhine and Neckar rivers in south western Germany includes the cities of Heidelberg, Mannheim and Ludwigshafen, and 21 universities and research institutions. || 
|-id=698
| 90698 Kościuszko || 1984 EA || Tadeusz Kościuszko (1746–1817), a Polish military engineer who assisted in the American revolution with the design and building of military fortifications, including at West Point, New York. || 
|}

90701–90800 

|-id=703
| 90703 Indulgentia ||  || Indulgentia, Latin for "indulgence, goodness, kindness, love, tenderness, fondness", and also "the gratification of another's desires, inclinations or humors" || 
|-id=709
| 90709 Wettin ||  || Wettin Castle, a castle near Halle, Saxony-Anhalt, Germany, ancestral seat of the Wettiner dynasty || 
|-id=711
| 90711 Stotternheim ||  || The German village of Stotternheim near Erfurt, where the young Martin Luther began his study. || 
|-id=712
| 90712 Wittelsbach ||  || Burg Wittelsbach, a castle ruin near Aichach in Bavaria, Germany, ancestral seat of the Wittelsbacher dynasty || 
|-id=713
| 90713 Chajnantor ||  || Chajnantor (5000 m), a plateau in the Atacama Desert of northern Chile, where the Atacama Large Millimeter Array will be constructed || 
|-id=717
| 90717 Flanders ||  || Flanders is the Dutch-speaking northern part of Belgium. In the late Middle Ages it was one of the richest and most urbanized parts of Europe, and a very sophisticated culture developed, with impressive achievements in the arts and architecture. || 
|-id=718
| 90718 Castel Gandolfo ||  || Castel Gandolfo is a small Italian town and the summer residence of the popes. The headquarters of the Vatican Observatory are located in the town. || 
|-id=732
| 90732 Opdebeeck || 1992 PO || Pierre Opdebeeck (born 1928), a philanthropist, was a financial adviser to Belgian industry for many years. After his retirement he started his study of 18th century French Enlightenment. || 
|}

90801–90900 

|-id=806
| 90806 Rudaki || 1995 AE || Rudaki (858–941) was a Persian poet, considered the founder of classical Persian literature. || 
|-id=817
| 90817 Doylehall || 1995 RO || Doyle Hall is an American astronomer and a key member of the Air Force Maui Optical and Supercomputing (AMOS) team, which supports a number of minor planet programs, including JPL's Near-Earth Asteroid Tracking program. || 
|-id=818
| 90818 Daverichards || 1995 RR || Dave Richards (born 1957) was the AMOS Commander during the last years of the twentieth century, ardently supporting the search for near-earth objects in collaboration with the Jet Propulsion Laboratory. || 
|-id=820
| 90820 McCann ||  || Jeff McCann (born 1962) was the AMOS Commander during the early years of the twenty-first century. He ensured that funding and support was always available for the NEAT program, and he was an inspiration to all who worked with him. || 
|-id=825
| 90825 Lizhensheng ||  || Li Zhensheng (born 1931) initiated wide-hybridization between common wheat and Thinopyrum ponticum and was also the originator of wheat-chromosome engineering in China. Several cultivars bred from the offspring of his distant hybridization have significantly improved wheat productivity in China || 
|-id=826
| 90826 Xuzhihong ||  || Xu Zhihong (born 1942), a Chinese botanist who steadfastly and effectively supported the development of Chinese astronomy during the periods when he was president of Beijing University and vice president of the Chinese Academy of Sciences || 
|-id=830
| 90830 Beihang ||  || Beihang University, founded in 1952, is one of the key institutes in the national agendas "211 Project" and "985 Scheme". It has made great contributions to China's aeronautic and astronautic industry, as well as social and economic development. || 
|-id=837
| 90837 Raoulvalentini ||  || Raoul Valentini (1908–1999), an Italian bookbinder, sundial maker and observer of variable stars. He was a member and secretary of the Italian Astronomical Society, and a co-founder of the Astronomical amateur society in Milan (Circolo Astrofili Milano). || 
|-id=875
| 90875 Hoshitori ||  || "Hoshitori" ("catching a starry sky") is a nickname for Tottori prefecture where Saji Observatory is located. Tottori has undertaken a dark skies campaign to preserve the night sky and it is one of the best dark sky locations in Japan. || 
|-id=892
| 90892 Betlémská kaple || 1997 BC || Bethlehem Chapel (Betlémská kaple), a medieval religious building in Prague, Czech Republic, notable for its connection with the religious reformer Jan Hus. He served there as an influential preacher from 1402 to 1412. The Chapel bearing the name of Bethlehem could contain almost 3000 people. It was restored in the 1950s. || 
|}

90901–91000 

|-id=918
| 90918 Jasinski ||  || Christian Jasinski (born 1963) was the first webmaster of the Association des Utilisateurs de Détecteurs Electroniques. He helped in both English translation and computer science, specifically for the AudeLA software || 
|-id=926
| 90926 Stáhalík ||  || Martin Stáhalík (1962–2001), Czech aerobatic pilot. || 
|-id=936
| 90936 Neronet ||  || Neronet is a new red grape variety developed by Vilém Kraus (b.~1924) in Lednice in southern Moravia, Czech Republic || 
|-id=937
| 90937 Josefdufek ||  || Josef Dufek (born 1950) is a Moravian winemaker || 
|-id=944
| 90944 Pujol ||  || Michel Pujol (born 1957) created an ethernet microcontroller designed for CCD cameras used by members of the Association des Utilisateurs de Détecteurs Electroniques. He is also a computer scientist who contributes to the AudeLA software || 
|-id=953
| 90953 Hideosaitou ||  || Hideo Saitou (born 1946) is the leader of activities of the Fukushima branch of the Japanese Young Astronauts Club, formed by the Japan Aerospace Exploration Agency. || 
|}

References 

090001-091000